The Siargao Island Sports and Tourism Complex (SISTC) is a sports complex in Dapa, Surigao del Norte, Philippines.

Construction
In November 2016, Surigao del Norte Governor Sol Matugas announced that 1.2 billion pesos had been allocated to improve infrastructure in the region. Siargao Sports Complex was given over 300 million pesos of that commitment. The sports complex was completed by January 15, 2020.

President Rodrigo Duterte led the inauguration of the facility on November 6, 2021.

Incidents

During Typhoon Rai in 2021, the complex suffered damage as the roof of the complex blew off due to high winds. The complex was used as an evacuation site during that time.

The complex was also used as a quarantine facility during the COVID-19 pandemic.

Facilities
The main stadium has two grandstand structures which also function as multi-purpose buildings and a track oval. The complex also includes a multi-purpose gymnasium, a swimming pool, a dormitory, and a convention center.

See also
Dapa
Butuan Polysports Complex
Surigao Provincial Sports Complex
List of indoor arenas in the Philippines
List of football stadiums in the Philippines

References

Sports complexes in the Philippines
Football venues in the Philippines
Buildings and structures in Surigao del Norte
Tourist attractions in Surigao del Norte